Laurent Michel de Champeaux de la Boulaye (2 January 1872 – 24 August 1921) was a French fencer. He competed in the men's épée event at the 1900 Summer Olympics.

References

External links
 

1872 births
1921 deaths
French male épée fencers
Olympic fencers of France
Fencers at the 1900 Summer Olympics
Fencers from Paris